Krzelów may refer to the following places in Poland:
Krzelów, Lower Silesian Voivodeship (south-west Poland)
Krzelów, Świętokrzyskie Voivodeship (south-central Poland)